Wuyuan may refer to:

Locations in China
 Wuyuan County, Jiangxi (婺源县)
 Wuyuan County, Inner Mongolia (五原县)
 Wuyuan Commandery (五原郡) of ancient China
 Wuyuan, Shanxi (吾元), a town in Tunliu County, Shanxi
 Wuyuan Subdistrict (武原街道), a subdistrict in Haiyan County, Zhejiang

See also
Qifu Gangui (died 412), formally Prince Wuyuan of Henan, a prince of the Western Qin state